Tiffany Scott (born May 1, 1977) is an American figure skater.

Scott was born in Hanson, Massachusetts. She skated with Philip Dulebohn until 2005. They competed at the 2002 Olympic Games and won the pairs title at the 2003 U.S. Championships. In 2005, Dulebohn retired from competition and Scott teamed up with Rusty Fein. Dulebohn was one of the pair's coaches during their brief partnership. Scott and Fein finished 4th at their first and only U.S. Figure Skating Championships in 2006.

Away from the ice, Scott married Brian Pryor in 2005. In May 2006, Scott announced her retirement from competitive skating. In March 2012, the couple had a son.

In the 2007 film Blades of Glory, Scott served as Amy Poehler's stunt double.

Programs  
(with Dulebohn)

(with Fein)

Results

With Dulebohn

With Fein

References

External links 

 

1977 births
American female pair skaters
Figure skaters at the 2002 Winter Olympics
Living people
Olympic figure skaters of the United States
Four Continents Figure Skating Championships medalists
21st-century American women
20th-century American women